Dicerocardiidae is an extinct family of fossil saltwater clams, marine heterodont bivalve molluscs, in the order Megalodontida.

Genera
Genera within the family Dicerocardiidae:
 †Cornucardia Koken 1913
 †Dicerocardium Stoppani 1856, the type genus
 †Physocardia Wahrmann 1894
 †Platycardia Beringer 1949
 †Pseudisocardia Douvillé 1912
 †Pseudisocardia Macfadyeni Cox 1935
 †Rostrocardia Freneix 1972

References
Paleobiology Database

Prehistoric bivalve families
Triassic first appearances
Cretaceous extinctions
Bivalve taxonomy